"The Caper Chase" is the nineteenth episode of the twenty-eighth season of the American animated television series The Simpsons, and the 615th episode of the series overall. It aired in the United States on Fox on April 2, 2017 and in the United Kingdom on Sky 1 on May 7, 2017.

Plot
A softball match is being played to little athletic achievement between teams from the Indian Point and Springfield Nuclear Plants. After Homer collapses on the field, Mr. Burns and the other coach talk about how the market for nuclear energy will be lucrative forever.

Burns goes to his alma mater, Yale University, to endow a chair in nuclear plant management, only to learn that the entire student body is now made of "highly entitled wusses" from the Whiffenpoofs on down, and who follow left-wing views that appall Burns. He then finds out that running a university can earn him a lot of money from a member of the Skull and Bones society named Bourbon Verlander. Burns then cuts a deal with Bourbon and withdraws all of his financial support to Yale in order to set up his own for-profit university, hiring the power plant workers including Homer, Lenny and Carl as the teachers.

Homer is not doing well with his students and Lisa, who is horrified that Homer became a professor mainly because he did not take the responsibility of educating people seriously, gives him a DVD box set of inspirational teachers movies. After watching them, he gets better at teaching and Burns sells Homer to Bourbon.

Homer meets Neil deGrasse Tyson, Ken Jennings, Suze Orman, and Robert McKee, and sees them being introduced to a group of young female "students" who are actually life-like humanoid robots that will all get into Yale and earn "financial aid" that gets funneled directly to Bourbon. Six months later, Homer ruins Bourbon's integration of the robots at Yale University with a microaggression that makes them all explode.

In the final scene, the teachers then start teaching Lisa, Marge, and Bart at the Simpson residence.

Reception
Dennis Perkins of The A.V. Club gave the episode a C+, stating "But 'The Caper Chase' is just all over the place, with Burns’ return to Yale spurring him to open a for-profit, Trump-style university like those of fellow nuclear plant maven Bourbon Verlander (guest voice Jason Alexander). That plot seems prepared to morph into an inspirational tale of Homer becoming a Dead Poets Society-esque teacher (skinflint Burns staffs the school with plant workers), until Verlander swoops in to whisk Homer away to his super-secret Ex Machina-styled retreat, where he’s got a scheme going involving an army of Ava-looking robot students working to get government loans. Book in some time for a handful of guest-teacher guest stars (Neil deGrasse Tyson, Suze Orman, Jeopardy champ Ken Jennings, and screenplay guru Robert McKee as themselves), and a very rushed wrap-up where Homer has to short-circuit all the Yale-enrolled robot students before they can make Verlander all that sweet, sweet student aid, and you’ve got a frenetic episode that can’t decide what it wants to be."

Tony Sokol of Den of Geek gave the episode 4.5/5 stars, stating "Release me, you hound. I love Mr. Burns, unabashedly and bashedly. I can see what Smithers sees in him. All that power in a man so fragile he floats away on cigar smoke and so old his living will is a sword of Damocles hanging over a trap door that leads to a mote of nuclear waste. Every single line, except the 'what what what' bit, is a joy tonight. We’ve come to our understanding of Burns through segmented antics at the expense of all who don’t like to pay. He is the embodiment of corporate corruption and political shenanigans. He could be his own Koch brother."

"The Caper Chase" scored a 0.9 rating with a 3 share and was watched by 2.13 million people, making it Fox's highest-rated show of the night.

References

External links
 

2017 American television episodes
The Simpsons (season 28) episodes